Revelação (English: Revelation) is a Brazilian telenovela produced and aired on SBT between the 8th of December 2008 until the 9th of June, 2009 and was replaced by Vende-se um Véu de Noiva.  It is an original story, created and written by Iris Abravanel, with the collaboration of Rita Valente, Grace Iwashita, Raphael Baumgardt, Caio Britto, Carlos Marques, Gustavo Braga, Fany Lima, text consultant Thereza di Giácomo and text supervision by Yves Dumont , directed of Jacques Lagoa and Annamaria Dias and the general director was Henrique Martins alongside general direction of theater-music of David Grimberg.

The telenovela stars Sérgio Abreu, Tainá Müller, Daniel Alvim, Talita Castro, Douglas Aguillar, Jiddu Pinheiro, Ana Carolina Godóy and Thaís Pacholek in the main roles.

Synopsis
A story of love, politics and betrayal in this production with outstanding Portuguese scenery. A man in love is forced to decide between his family and power.

Cast

References 

2008 Brazilian television series debuts
2009 Brazilian television series endings